Smithbrook Wines is an Australian winery at Middlesex, in the Pemberton wine region of Western Australia.  Established in 1988, it has been owned since 2009 by Peter and Lee Fogarty, who also own several other wineries.

See also

 Australian wine
 List of wineries in Western Australia
 Western Australian wine

References

Notes

Bibliography

External links
Smithbrook Wines – official site

Companies established in 1988
Pemberton, Western Australia
Wineries in Western Australia
1988 establishments in Australia